The 37th Tengen began on 7 July 2010. The winner of the challenger tournament will face title holder Yuki Satoshi in a best-of-five finals.

Tournament

Finals

References

2011 in go
Go competitions in Japan